Ulrich Spiesshofer (born 26 March 1964), is the former chief executive officer of the ABB Group, a leading power and automation technology company, headquartered in Zurich, Switzerland. He took up the role on 15 September 2013, succeeding Joe Hogan. Previously, Spiesshofer had headed ABB's Discrete Automation and Motion division, which includes the company's robotics, power conversion, motors and drives businesses. Spiesshofer stepped down 17 April 2019.

Early life and education
Spiesshofer was born in Aalen, in the southwestern German state of Baden-Wuerttemberg. He holds a PhD in economics as well as a master's degree in business administration and engineering from the University of Stuttgart.

Career
From 1991 to 2002, Spiesshofer worked for AT Kearney management consultants, rising to become the managing director of AT Kearney International, during which time he ran consulting businesses in industries including oil and gas, utilities, telecommunications and automotive, in Europe, Asia and the Americas. He then spent three years as a senior partner and global head of the operations practice at Roland Berger Strategy Consultants in Switzerland.

Spiesshofer joined ABB in 2005 as Executive Committee member responsible for strategy development. In 2010, he was appointed Head of Discrete Automation and Motion, one of ABB's five divisions. There, he led the acquisition of Baldor Electric, the largest maker of industrial motors in North America. It was ABB's biggest acquisition to date with a purchase price of $4.2 billion. In 2013, Spiesshofer was appointed CEO of ABB, a position he held until 2019.

As CEO, he led the ABB acquisition of GE Industrial Systems, which was announced in 2017.

Other activities
 European Round Table of Industrialists (ERT), Member

Personal life
Spiesshofer is an avid skier, sailor and amateur musician, accomplished at the clarinet, saxophone and accordion. He lives with his wife Natalie and two children, Nicolas and Louis, in Zurich.

References

1964 births
German corporate directors
Businesspeople in technology
University of Stuttgart alumni
Living people